This article contains a list of Indonesian endemic butterflies also of those endemic to New Guinea and Borneo (politically divided but biogeographic entities).

Danainae

Danaus ismare - Ismare tiger
Euploea albicosta - Biak dark crow
Euploea caespes - Murphy's crow
Euploea configurata - Sulawesi striped blue crow
Euploea cordelia - Cordelia's crow
Euploea dentiplaga - Seram crow
Euploea eleusina
Euploea eupator - Sulawesi pied crow
Euploea gamelia - Javan crow
Euploea hewitsonii
Euploea latifasciata - Weymer's crow
Euploea magou - magou
Euploea martinii - Sumatran crow
Euploea morosa
Euploea redtenbacheri
Euploea tripunctata - Biak threespot crow
Euploea westwoodii
Idea blanchardii
Idea durvillei

Idea idea
Idea tambusisiana - Bedford-Russell's tree-nymph
Ideopsis hewitsonii - Hewitson's small tree-nymph
Ideopsis klassika - Seram small tree-nymph
Ideopsis oberthurii
Ideopsis vitrea
Parantica albata - Zinken's tiger
Parantica cleona
Parantica dabrerai - D'Abrera's tiger
Parantica hypowattan - Morishita's tiger
Parantica kuekenthali - Kuekenthal's yellow tiger
Parantica marcia - Biak tiger
Parantica menadensis - Manado yellow tiger
Parantica philo - Sumbawa tiger
Parantica pseudomelaneus - Javan tiger
Parantica sulewattan - Bonthain tiger
Parantica tityoides - Sumatran chocolate tiger
Parantica toxopei - Toxopeus' yellow tiger
Parantica wegneri - Flores tiger

Morphinae
Amathusia duponti Toxopeus, 1951 Java
Amathusia lieftincki Toxopeus, 1951 Java
Amathusia ochrotaenia Toxopeus, 1951 Sumatra
Amathusia taenia Fruhstorfer, 1899 Java, Lombok, Bawean
Amathusia virgata Butler, 1870 Sulawesi

Heliconiinae
Cirrochroa clagia (Godart, [1824]) Java, Sumatra
Cupha lampetia (Linnaeus, 1764) Moluccas
Cupha maeonides (Hewitson, 1859) Sulawesi
Cupha myronides Felder, 1860 Moluccas

Limenitidinae

Athyma eulimene (Godart, [1824]) Sulawesi
Lebadea alankara (Horsfield, [1829]) Java, Sumatra, Borneo
Lexias aegle (Doherty, 1891) Lesser Sunda Islands
Lexias immaculata Snellen, 1890 Belitung (Sumatra)
Lexias perdix (Butler, 1884) Nias (Sumatra)
Lexias elna (van de Poll, 1895) Nias (Sumatra)
Lexias aeetes (Hewitson, 1861) Sulawesi
Moduza lycone (Hewitson, 1859) Sulawesi
Moduza lymire (Hewitson, 1859) Sulawesi
Neptis celebica (Moore, 1899) Sulawesi
Neptis ida Moore, 1858 Sulawesi
Neptis nisaea de Nicéville, 1894 Java
Neptis brebissonii (Boisduval, 1832) New Guinea
Pantoporia antara (Moore, 1858 Sulawesi
Pantoporia mysia (C. & R. Felder, 1860) Moluccas
Tanaecia orphne Butler, 1870 Borneo
Tanaecia amisa Grose-Smith, 1889 Borneo
Tanaecia elone (de Nicéville, 1893) Borneo, Sumatra
Tanaecia trigerta (Moore, [1858]) Java
Tanaecia valmikis C. & R. Felder, [1867] Borneo
Tanaecia lutala (Moore, 1859) Borneo
Tanaecia vikrama C. & R. Felder, [1867] Sumatra

Cyrestinae
Cyrestis nais Wallace, 1869 Timor, Lombok, Sumba
Cyrestis telamon Linnaeus, 1758 Moluccas

Satyrinae

Elymnias amoena Tsukada & Nishiyama, 1979 Sumba
Elymnias ceryx (Boisduval, 1836) Java, Sumatra
Elymnias cumaea C. & R. Felder, [1867] Sulawesi
Elymnias sangira Fruhstorfer, 1899 Sanghie Islands, Sulawesi
Elymnias cybele (C. & R. Felder, 1860) West Irian, Moluccas
Elymnias hewitsoni Wallace, 1869 Sulawesi
Elymnias hicetas Wallace, 1869 Sulawesi
Elymnias kamara Moore, [1858] Java, Sumatra, Bali, Lombok
Elymnias mimalon (Hewitson, 1861) Sulawesi
Elymnias nelsoni Corbet, 1942 Mentawai Islands (Sumatra)
Elymnias nepheronides Fruhstorfer, 1907 Flores (Lesser Sunda Islands)
Elymnias pellucida Fruhstorfer, 1895 Borneo
Elymnias vitellia (Stoll, [1781]) Moluccas
Elymnias detanii Aoki & Uémura, 1982 Flores (Lesser Sunda Islands)
Elymnias tamborana Okubo, 2010 Sumbawa (Lesser Sunda Islands)

Nymphalinae

Vanessa buana (Fruhstorfer, 1898) Sulawesi
Vanessa samani (Hagen, 1895) Sumatra
Vanessa dilecta Hanafusa, 1992 Timor
Mynes websteri Grose-Smith, 1894

Papilionidae

Atrophaneura dixoni
Atrophaneura hageni
Atrophaneura kuehni
Atrophaneura luchti
Atrophaneura orean
Atrophaneura palu - Palu swallowtail
Atrophaneura polyphontes
Atrophaneura priapus - Priapus batwing
Graphium agamemnon
Graphium androcles
Graphium deucalion
Graphium dorcus
Graphium encelades
Graphium meyeri
Graphium milon
Graphium monticolum
Graphium rhesus
Graphium stresemanni
Graphium sumatranum
Ornithoptera aesacus - golden birdwing
Ornithoptera croesus - Wallace's golden birdwing
Ornithoptera rothschildi - Rothschilds's birdwing
Ornithoptera tithonus - Tithonus birdwing
Papilio ascalaphus
Papilio blumei

Papilio deiphobus
Papilio diophantus
Papilio forbesi
Papilio gambrisius
Papilio gigon
Papilio heringi
Papilio hipponous
Papilio inopinatus
Papilio jordani - Jordan's swallowtail
Papilio lampsacus
Papilio lorquinianus - sea green swallowtail
Papilio neumoegeni
Papilio peranthus
Papilio sataspes
Papilio tydeus
Papilio veiovis
Troides criton - Criton birdwing
Troides dohertyi - Talaud black birdwing
Troides haliphron - Haliphron birdwing
Troides hypolitus - Rippon's birdwing
Troides prattorum - Buru opalescent birdwing
Troides riedeli - Riedel's birdwing
Troides staudingeri
Troides vandepolli - Van de Poll's birdwing

Lycaenidae

Poritia fruhstorferi Corbet, 1940 Java, Sumatra
Poritia phormedon Druce, 1895 Borneo
Poritia palos Osada, 1987 Sulawesi
Poritia personata Osada, 1994 Sulawesi
Deramas wolletti Eliot, 1970 Borneo
Deramas nigrescens Eliot, 1964 Sulawesi
Deramas masae Kawai, 1994 Sulawesi
Deramas nanae Osada, 1994 Sulawesi
Deramas suwartinae Osada, 1987 Sulawesi
Allotinus agnolia Eliot, 1986 Sumatra
Allotinus nicholsi Moulton, [1912] Borneo, Sumatra
Allotinus paetus (de Nicéville, 1895) Sumatra
Allotinus parapus Fruhstorfer, 1913 Borneo
Allotinus major C. & R. Felder, [1865] Sulawesi
Allotinus maximus Staudinger, 1888 Sulawesi
Allotinus brooksi Eliot, 1986 Borneo
Allotinus bidiensis Eliot, 1986 Borneo
Allotinus macassarensis (Holland, 1891) Sulawesi
Prosotas elsa (Grose-Smith, 1895) Ambon, Maluku
Prosotas ella Toxopeus, 1930  Sulawesi 
Prosotas datarica (Snellen, 1892)  Java
Prosotas norina Toxopeus, 1929  Java
Britomartis igarashii (H. Hayashi, 1976)
Udara coalita (de Nicéville, 1891) Java
Udara aristinus (Fruhstorfer, 1917) Java
Udara toxopeusi (Corbet, 1937) Sumatra
Hypochrysops anacletus (Felder, 1860) Ambon, Serang, Saparua
Hypochrysops chrysanthis (Felder, 1860) Ambon, Serang
Hypochrysops doleschallii (Felder, 1860) Serang, Ambon, Halmaheira
Hypochrysops siren Grose-Smith, 1894 Halmahera, Obi
Hypochrysops calliphon Grose-Smith, 1894 New Guinea 
Hypochrysops plotinus Grose-Smith, 1894 New Guinea
Hypochrysops hypates Hewitson, 1874 Halmahera
Hypochrysops eucletus C. & R. Felder, 1865 New Guinea
Hypochrysops rufinus Grose-Smith, 1898 New Guinea
Hypochrysops boisduvali Oberthür, 1894 New Guinea
Hypochrysops chrysodesmus Grose-Smith, 1899 New Guinea
Hypochrysops mirabilis Pagenstecher, 1894 New Guinea
Hypochrysops pyrodes Cassidy, 2003 Sulawesi
Hypochrysops bakeri (Joicey & Talbot, 1916) New Guinea
Hypochrysops ribbei (Röber, 1886) New Guinea
Hypochrysops makrikii (Ribbe, 1901)Serang, Ambon
Hypochrysops coruscans (Grose-Smith, 1897) New Guinea, Serang
Hypochrysops dinawa (Bethune-Baker, 1908) New Guinea
Hypochrysops pratti (Bethune-Baker, 1913) New Guinea
Hypochrysops utyi (Bethune-Baker, 1913) New Guinea
Arhopala alica Evans, 1957 Borneo
Arhopala dajagaka Bethune-Baker, 1896 Borneo
Arhopala baluensis Bethune-Baker, 1904 Borneo
Arhopala aenigma Eliot, 1972 Borneo
Arhopala weelii Piepers & Snellen, 1918 Java
Arhopala sceva Bethune-Baker, 1903 Borneo, Sumatra
Arhopala denta (Evans, 1957) Borneo
Arhopala sangira Bethune-Baker, 1897 Sulawesi
Arhopala axiothea (Hewitson, 1869]) New Guinea
Arhopala bella Bethune-Baker, 1896 Borneo
Arhopala borneensis Bethune-Baker, 1896 Borneo
Arhopala hercules (Hewitson, 1862) New Guinea
Arhopala helianthes Grose-Smith, 1902 New Guinea
Drupadia cinderella Cowan, 1974 Borneo
Drupadia cineas (Grose-Smith, 1889) Borneo
Drupadia cinesia (Hewitson, 1863) Borneo
Rapala vajana Corbet, 1940 Java

Tajuria lucullus Druce, 1904 Borneo
Tajuria discalis Fruhstorfer, 1897 Flores, Java, Bali
Philiris cyana (Bethune-Baker, 1908) New Guinea
Philiris violetta (Röber, 1926) New Guinea
Philiris sublutea (Bethune-Baker, 1906) New Guinea
Philiris caerulea Tite, 1963 New Guinea
Philiris hemileuca  (Jordan, 1930) New Guinea
Philiris hypoxantha  (Röber, 1926) New Guinea
Philiris helena  (Snellen, 1887) New Guinea, Moluccas
Philiris philotoides Tite, 1963 New Guinea
Philiris ianthina Tite, 1963 New Guinea
Philiris agatha  (Grose-Smith, 1899) New Guinea
Philiris montigena Tite, 1963 New Guinea
Philiris praeclara Tite, 1963 New Guinea
Philiris elegans Tite, 1963 New Guinea
Philiris lavendula Tite, 1963 New Guinea
Philiris ariadne Wind & Clench, 1947 New Guinea
Philiris unipunctata   (Bethune-Baker, 1908) New Guinea
Philiris caelestisSands, 1979 New Guinea
Philiris refusa  (Grose-Smith, 1894) New Guinea
Philiris amethysta Sands, 1981 New Guinea
Philiris intensa  (Butler, 1876) New Guinea, Moluccas
Philiris zadne  (Grose-Smith, 1898) New Guinea
Philiris kumusiensisTite, 1963 New Guinea
Philiris argenteus (Rothschild, 1915) New Guinea
Philiris scintillata Sands, 1981 New Guinea
Philiris aquamarina  Sands, 1981 New Guinea
Philiris azula Wind & Clench, 1947 New Guinea
Philiris pagwi Sands, 1979 New Guinea
Philiris angabunga (Bethune-Baker, 1908) New Guinea
Philiris maculata Sands, 1981 New Guinea
Philiris biplaga Sands, 1981 New Guinea
Philiris remissa Tite, 1963 New Guinea
Philiris moluccana Tite, 1963, Moluccas
Philiris mayri Wind & Clench, 1947 New Guinea
Philiris misimensis Wind & Clench, 1947 New Guinea
Philiris cadmica Sands, 1981 New Guinea
Philiris phengotes Tite, 1963 New Guinea
Philiris dinawa  (Bethune-Baker, 1908) New Guinea
Philiris moira  (Grose-Smith, 1899) New Guinea
Philiris ignobilis (Joicey & Talbot, 1916) New Guinea
Philiris albicostalis Tite, 1963 New Guinea
Philiris marginata  (Grose-Smith, 1894) New Guinea
Philiris doreia Tite, 1963 New Guinea
Philiris goliathensis Tite, 1963 New Guinea
Philiris vicina  (Grose-Smith, 1898) New Guinea
Philiris albihumerata Tite, 1963 New Guinea
Philiris subovata  (Grose-Smith, 1894) New Guinea
Philiris oreas Tite, 1963 New Guinea
Philiris kapaura Tite, 1963 New Guinea
Philiris baiteta Müller, 2014 New Guinea
Philiris bubalisatina Müller, 2014 New Guinea
Philiris hindenburgensis Müller, 2014 New Guinea

Philiris parsonsi  Müller, 2014 New Guinea
Philiris petriei  Müller, 2014 New Guinea 
Philiris radicala Müller, 2014 New Guinea
Philiris sibataniiSands, 1979 New Guinea
Philiris tapini Sands, 1979 New Guinea
Sidima amarylde Eliot & Kawazoé, 1983 New Guinea
Sukidion inores (Hewitson, 1872)
Thamala moultoni Corbet, 1942 Borneo

Pieridae
Appias aurosa (Yata & Vane-Wright) Sulawesi
Appias zarinda (Boisduval, 1836) Sulawesi, Buru-Maluku
Appias ithome (C. & R. Felder, 1859) Sulawesi 
Cepora celebensis (Watanabe, 1987) Sulawesi
Cepora eperia (Boisduval, 1836) Sulawesi
Cepora fora (Watanabe, 1987) Sulawesi
Cepora timnatha (Hewitson, 1862) Sulawesi 
Delias crithoe Boisduval 1836 Java, Sumatra
Delias momea (Boisduval, 1836) Sumatra
Delias fruhstorferi (Honrath, 1892) Java
Delias dorylaea (C. & R. Felder, [1865]) Java
Delias eileenae Joicey & Talbot, 1926 Timor
Delias belisama (Cramer, [1780]) Java, Sumatra, Bali
Delias eumolpe Grose-Smith, 1889 Borneo
Delias kuhni Honrath, 1886 Sulawesi
Delias battana Fruhstorfer, 1896 Sulawesi
Delias surprisa Martin, 1913 Sulawesi
Delias benasu Martin, [1913] Sulawesi
Delias rosenbergi (Vollenhoven, 1865) Sulawesi
Delias zebuda Hewitson, (1862) Sulawesi 
Delias mitisi Staudinger, 1895 Sulawesi
Eurema beatrix (Toxopeus, 1939) Java
Pareronia kyokoeae Nishimura, 1996 Sumatra
Ixias flavipennis Grose-Smith, 1885 Sumatra
Ixias malumsinicum Thieme, 1896 Sumatra
Ixias paluensis Martin, 1914 Sulawesi
Ixias piepersii (Snellen, 1878) Sulawesi
Ixias vollenhovii (Wallace, 1867) Timor
Ixias venilia (Godart, 1819) Java

Hesperiidae
Pirdana albicornis Elwes & Edwards, 1897 Borneo
Pirdana ismene (C. & R. Felder, [1867]) Sulawesi
Celaenorrhinus entellus (Hewitson, 1867) Java
Celaenorrhinus saturatus Elwes & Edwards, 1897 Java
Celaenorrhinus toxopei de Jong, 1981 Java
Hasora alta de Jong, 1982 Sumatra
Hasora sakit Maruyama & Ueda, 1992 Sulawesi
Hasora umbrina (Mabille, 1891) Sulawesi
Caltoris beraka (Plötz, 1885) Sulawesi, Sangihe, Sula Islands
Caltoris mehavagga (Fruhstorfer, 1911) Sulawesi, Sula Islands, Buru
Mooreana boisduvali (Mabille, 1876) Celebes
Dyrzela violacea Holloway, 1989 Borneo
Dyrzela boscoides Holloway, 1989 Borneo
Koruthaialos focula (Plötz, 1882) Java, Sumatra, Borneo
Isma cinnamomea (Elwes & Edwards, 1897) Borneo, Sumatra
Isma binotata Elwes & Edwards, 1897 Borneo
Mimene kolbei (Ribbe, 1899) New Guinea
Mimene melie (de Nicéville, 1895) New Guinea

See also
 List of butterflies of Sulawesi
 List of butterflies of Peninsular Malaysia
 List of butterflies of Papua New Guinea

References
 Ackery, P.R. & R.J. Vane-Wright. Milkweed Butterflies, 1984. Cornell University Press, Ithaca, NY, cited in Indonesia Endemic Butterflies Checklist
 
Living National Treasures Checklist of Endemic Swallowtail and Milkweed Butterfly Species, accessed 19 October 2016.
Otsuka, K., 1988. Butterflies of Borneo. Tobishima Corporation, Tokyo.
Parsons, M. J.  1998 The butterflies of Papua New Guinea. Their systematics and biologyLondon (Academic Press), 737 pp., 26 + 139 pls.

I
 
Insects of Indonesia
Endemic fauna of Indonesia
Butterflies
Indonesia